Henderson is a city in Clark County, Nevada, United States, about  southeast of downtown Las Vegas. It is the second largest city in Nevada, after Las Vegas, with an estimated population of 320,189 in 2019. The city is part of the Las Vegas Valley.

Henderson is known for its supply of magnesium during World War II. With the decline of magnesium production, the Nevada legislature approved a bill that gave Nevada's Colorado River Commission the authority to purchase the industrial plants, and Henderson was incorporated in 1953. Henderson is the location of Lake Las Vegas.

History

The township of Henderson first emerged in the 1940s during World War II with the building of the Basic Magnesium Plant. Henderson quickly became the main supplier of magnesium in the United States, which was called the "miracle metal" of World War II. The plant supplied the US War Department with magnesium for incendiary munition casings and airplane engines, frames, and other parts. A quarter of all US wartime magnesium came from the Henderson Plant to strengthen aluminum, using 25% of Hoover Dam's power to separate the metal from its ore by electrolysis. Mayor Jim Gibson's grandfather, Fred D. Gibson, was one of the original engineers sent to Great Britain to learn the secret of creating the "miracle metal" which would help the United States and its allies win the war. The British liaison officer sent to Henderson, Major Charles Ball, had a main thoroughfare named after him. Because of concerns about having a street named “Ball Avenue”, the name was later changed to “Major Avenue”.

Although "born in America's defense", Henderson's future after World War II was uncertain. In 1947, magnesium production was no longer necessary for defense, and most of the Black Mountain Industrial (BMI) Complex's 14,000 employees moved away. Enrollment in the school system was reduced by two thirds, and well over half the townsite houses, built to house plant workers, became vacant. In 1947, the United States War Asset Administration offered Henderson for sale as war surplus property.

In an effort to save the city, the Nevada Legislature spent a weekend visiting Henderson, evaluating the possibility of state administration of Basic Magnesium. Within days of the visit, the legislators unanimously approved a bill that gave Nevada's Colorado River Commission the authority to purchase the industrial plants. Governor Vail Pittman signed the bill on March 27, 1947, helping save Henderson from becoming war surplus property.

With the help of local industry, Henderson was incorporated on April 16, 1953 as the City of Henderson. On May 23, 1953, Henderson, with its population of 7,410, elected Dr. Jim French as the first mayor.

Rocket fuel factory fire

In 1988, the Pacific Engineering and Production Company of Nevada (PEPCON) rocket fuel factory, in the modern-day Gibson Springs neighborhood of Henderson, caught fire. The blaze quickly engulfed the factory, spewing rocket fuel, smoke, and toxic fumes from the building, eventually obliterating it in a massive explosion, followed by six smaller explosions. These explosions sent shockwaves throughout Henderson and parts of the Las Vegas Valley that shattered glass and damaged buildings. Two people were killed and 372 were injured. Investigators surveying the damage in the surrounding communities estimated the blast as similar to a 1-kiloton airblast nuclear detonation.

The events of the PEPCON factory disaster spurred development in Henderson years later, from its historical industrial development to residential and commercial development. There are now no signs of the explosion where it happened. Today, the site consists mostly of office buildings.

Geography

The city is in the Mojave Desert with wildlife and vegetation typical of the Mojave. The mountains that surround Henderson mostly have gentle slopes. The McCullough Range is closest to the city; most of this range is covered by black rocks from a volcanic explosion millions of years ago. The landscape consists of the desert; the only water in the city is found in washes like Duck Creek.

Residential neighborhoods in Henderson include Anthem, Anthem Country Club, Ascaya, Black Mountain Vistas, Cadence, Calico Ridge, Champion Village, The Fountains, Grand Legacy, Green Valley, Green Valley Estates, Green Valley Ranch, Hillsboro Heights, Inspirada, Lake Las Vegas, MacDonald Highlands, MacDonald Ranch, Madeira Canyon, Club at Madeira Canyon, Roma Hills, Seven Hills, Sun City Anthem, Sun City MacDonald Ranch, Tuscany Village, and Whitney Ranch.

Climate
Henderson is classified as having a hot desert climate (BWh) in the Köppen climate classification. It has mild winters and hot summers. Snow can occasionally fall in the winter. The monsoon can bring storms in the summer, which can cause flash flooding and thunderstorms. The hottest month is July and the coldest month is December. On average there are 292 clear days per year.

Demographics

At the census of 2010, 257,729 people resided in Henderson. The racial makeup was 76.9% White, 5.1% African American, 0.7% Native American, 7.2% Asian, 0.6% Pacific Islander, and 4.8% from two or more races. Hispanic or Latino of any race were 14.9% of the population and 68.7% of the population was non-Hispanic White.

According to the 2000 census, there were 175,381 people, 66,331 households, and 47,095 families residing in the city. The city's racial makeup was 80.49% White, 3.76% African American, 0.70% Native American, 3.98% Asian, 0.42% Pacific Islander, 3.16% from other races, and 3.49% from two or more races. Hispanic or Latino of any race were 13.71% of the population.

There were 66,331 households, out of which 33.0% had children under the age of 18 living with them, 56.4% were married couples living together, 10.0% had a female householder with no husband present, and 29.0% were non-families. 20.3% of all households were made up of individuals, and 5.0% had someone living alone who was 65 years of age or older. The average household size was 2.63 and the average family size was 3.05.

In the city, the population was spread out, with 25.1% under the age of 18, 7.9% from 18 to 24, 32.5% from 25 to 44, 24.4% from 45 to 64, and 10.1% who were 65 years of age or older. The median age for the city was 36 years. For every 100 females, there were 98.4 males. For every 100 females age 18 and over, there were 96.4 males.

The city's median household income was $63,830, and the median family income was $74,120. The per capita income for the city was $33,238. The Henderson zip code 89012 where MacDonald Highlands is located, has the 7th highest per-capita income in the United States at $148,899. About 3.9% of families and 5.6% of the population were below the poverty line, including 6.4% of those under age 18 and 4.7% of those age 65 or over.

Economy

Top employers
According to the city's Comprehensive Annual Financial Report, fiscal year ending June 30, 2016, the city's largest employers are:

In July 2020, Amazon announced the opening of a new,  facility in Henderson.

Culture and entertainment

An increasing number of major shopping malls, movie theater complexes, concert venues, restaurants and casino resorts offer residents a variety of choices for leisure time in Henderson. The city also sits a few miles southeast of Las Vegas and is not too far from the world-famous Las Vegas Strip. "Shakespeare in the Park" celebrated its tenth anniversary in 1996, a testament to Henderson's long-standing support for the arts and cultural programs. The city also boasts the largest recreational facility – the Multigenerational Facility at Liberty Pointe – in Nevada as well as Nevada's only scenic Bird Preserve. The city supports a variety of other cultural events, many of which are held at the outdoor amphitheater, the largest one of its kind in Nevada.

Film history
The documentary Real CSI featured the Henderson Police Department (HPD) Crime Scene Analysts/Investigators.
The 1998 film Lethal Weapon 4 used Interstate 215 as a filming location.
A scene in the James Bond film Diamonds Are Forever in which Bond (Sean Connery) is nearly cremated alive was filmed at Palm Mortuary's Henderson location. Later in the movie, he is dumped into a pipeline, which was filmed near Lake Mead Boulevard. The construction office for the Lake Mead to Las Vegas water pipeline was there during the building of the pipeline and the filming of the movie.
America's Sweethearts, starring Julia Roberts and John Cusack, featured many scenes filmed at Lake Las Vegas.
Paranormal Activity 4 takes place at the home of a wealthy family in Henderson.

Select points of interest

 Acacia Demonstration Gardens
 Anthem Country Club
 Ascaya
 Black Mountain Recreation Center
 Clark County Heritage Museum
 The District at Green Valley Ranch
 Ethel M Botanical Cactus Garden
 Ethel M Chocolate Factory
 Galleria at Sunset
 Green Valley Ranch Resort, Spa, and Casino
 Henderson Bird Viewing Preserve and Water Reclamation Facility
 Henderson International School
 Henderson Pavilion Concert Theater and Recreational Plaza
 Lake Las Vegas
 Lamborghini Las Vegas
 M Resort
 MacDonald Highlands
 Montelago Village and Boutiques
 Nevada State College
 Ravella at Lake Las Vegas
 Rio Secco Golf Club
 Roma Hills
 Seven Hills Estates
 Sunset Station
 Veteran's Wall
 Water Street District
 Westin Resort at Lake Las Vegas
 Wildhorse Golf Club

Hiking trails

Government
The city received its charter from the Nevada State Legislature in 1953, formally incorporating the city with a council/manager form of government.

Henderson is divided into four wards. A mayor and four council members are elected citywide, but no more than one council member are allowed to reside in each ward.

Lorna Kesterson was elected as Henderson's first female mayor, serving two terms until 1993.

Fire prevention services are provided by the Henderson Fire Department and police services by the Henderson Police Department.

2013 Americans with Disabilities Act settlement
In 2013, the Department of Justice (DOJ) announced it had reached a cooperative settlement agreement with the city of Henderson under the Americans with Disabilities Act (ADA). The DOJ received complaints by individuals who are deaf that officers for the city of Henderson did not provide them with qualified sign language interpreters and other auxiliary aids and services when needed for effective communication. One of the complainants was arrested and detained for two days in the Henderson detention facility, while the other was an alleged crime victim.

During its investigation into the allegations, the department inquired whether the city of Henderson would be interested in resolving the matter voluntarily. The city expressed its full commitment to ensure compliance with the ADA. Under the settlement, the city of Henderson will pay $35,000 to the complainants. The city agreed to provide sign language interpreters, usually within an hour of a person's request to law enforcement officers. Henderson also agreed to modify its handcuffing policies for people who use sign language or hand writing to communicate, and to adopt other policies consistent with the ADA.

Education
The Clark County School District provides elementary and secondary public education. Henderson is the location for 29 elementary schools, nine middle schools, and nine high schools. Five of the nine high schools are public schools, being Basic, Coronado, Green Valley, Foothill, and Liberty. The remaining four are private college preparatory schools, including the Henderson International School. A tenth high school, Silverado High School, also serves parts of Henderson but is in the unincorporated Clark County (Paradise).

Findlay College Prep

Findlay Prep was a high school basketball program sponsored by the Henderson International School. Henderson International School – a private preparatory school owned by Meritas – hosted Findlay College Prep. Since its creation in 2006 by businessman Cliff Findlay, its dozen students comprised the school's only high school students. Findlay has had several McDonald's All-Americans and alumni playing in the National Basketball Association (NBA).

Colleges and universities
Henderson is home to several colleges and universities. Nevada State College, a baccalaureate college in the Nevada System of Higher Education. The Roseman University of Health Sciences, a private university which awards degrees in nursing, pharmacy, and business, is in Henderson. The College of Southern Nevada, a community college based in Las Vegas, maintains a branch campus in Henderson. California's National University, Touro University Nevada and Devry University also maintain a campus in Henderson.

Several for-profit colleges also operate in the city, including the International Academy of Design & Technology (Henderson campus closed in 2016), The Art Institute of Las Vegas, and Everest College.

Library
Henderson has a public library, the Henderson District Public Libraries.

Sports

Henderson is home to the headquarters of the Las Vegas Raiders. In February 2018, the then Oakland Raiders (who in 2017 announced they would relocate to Las Vegas in time for the 2020 NFL season) announced the signing of a deal for 55 acres of land near Henderson Executive Airport, on which the team's executive offices and practice facility were built. The Intermountain Healthcare Performance Center opened in June 2020.

Henderson is scheduled to be home to the headquarters of the Las Vegas Aces of the Women's National Basketball Association. In February 2021, ground was broken for a Aces facility next to the Raiders facility. The 50,000 square foot facility will house the Aces’ practice facility, offices, training room, weight room, hydrotherapy space, physical therapy area, locker rooms, a lecture hall, player and alumni lounges, and an on-site day care center and is expected to be completed by March 2023.

The Henderson Silver Knights of the American Hockey League play in a 6,000-seat arena, the Dollar Loan Center in Henderson. The arena is also home to the Vegas Knight Hawks of the Indoor Football League, and the NBA G League Ignite of the NBA G League.

Minor professional teams

Media

Newspapers
Las Vegas Review-Journal
Las Vegas Sun
Green Valley View
The Henderson Press

Television
KVVU-TV (channel 5) is the Las Vegas Valley's Fox affiliate and licensed to Henderson, and is based from studios on the northwest side of the city.

Transportation
The city is served by RTC Transit (formerly Citizens Area Transit/CAT) with its network of bus routes which run throughout the Las Vegas Valley.

Henderson is served by four major highways: Henderson Black Hills and (State Route 582), which is the main thoroughfare connecting with Las Vegas and Boulder City; Lake Mead Parkway (State Route 564); Interstate 515 and Interstate 215. State Route 146, also known as Saint Rose Parkway, connects Interstate 15 near Sloan with Interstate 215 in Green Valley. This stretch is formally a part of Lake Mead Parkway which is a direct link to Henderson for motorists traveling in and out of Southern California.

The city of Henderson has a low percentage of households without a car. In 2015, 2.8 percent of Henderson households lacked a car, and increased to 5 percent in 2016. The national average was 8.7 percent in 2016. Henderson averaged 1.74 cars per household in 2016, compared to a national average of 1.8.

Henderson is home for the Henderson Executive Airport. The main airport for the metropolitan area is Harry Reid International Airport, northwest of Henderson.

Street numbering is different within the city of Henderson than with the rest of the Las Vegas Valley. The center of Henderson lies within the intersection of Water Street and Lake Mead Parkway. The Henderson Police Department for years referred to Lake Mead Parkway (and its former name Lake Mead Drive) as "146", while Boulder Highway is often referred as "93", its former highway designation.

The Union Pacific Railroad serves Henderson over a branch line originally built to support construction of Hoover Dam. The final few miles of the line, owned by the U.S. Government, were abandoned after the dam was completed. The line still extends to Boulder City; in 1985, the state purchased the section east of appropriately I-515, with the Nevada Southern Railroad Museum operating excursion trains over the easternmost seven miles (11 km).

Notable people
The following is an incomplete list of notable Henderson residents:

Steve Aoki (born 1977), electro-house musician, record producer, DJ and music executive
Erica Blasberg (1984–2010), LPGA golfer
Toni Braxton (born 1967), singer
Lisa Cano Burkhead, 36th Lieutenant Governor of Nevada
Glen and Les Charles, creators of Cheers and Taxi
Andrew Cherng (born 1948), founder of Panda Express
Tony Curtis (1925–2010), actor
Phyllis Davis (1940–2013), film and television actress
 Hailey Dawson (born 2010), girl with 3D-printed robotic hand
Sheena Easton (born 1959), Scottish singer and actress 
Flavor Flav (born 1959), rap music artist and reality television personality
Brandon Flowers (born 1981), vocalist for The Killers
Joey Gallo, professional baseball outfielder
Jeff Gillan (born 1957), journalist
Greg Haugen (born 1960), three-time world champion boxer
Joe Heck (born 1961), U.S. Army Brigadier General, former U.S. Representative, and 2016 Republican nominee for United States Senate in Nevada
Iris Kyle (born 1974), professional female bodybuilder
Pierre Omidyar (born 1967), CEO and founder of eBay
Jermaine O'Neal (born 1978), NBA player
Marie Osmond (born 1959), singer, doll designer, and talk show host
Paul Pierce (born 1977), NBA player
Harry Reid (1939–2021), retired United States Senator
Jacky Rosen (born 1957), United States Senator
Nia Sanchez (born 1990), Miss Nevada USA 2014, Miss USA 2014 and 1st runner-up Miss Universe 2014
David Sklansky (born 1947), professional poker player/author
Mike Tyson (born 1966), retired heavyweight boxer and television personality
Nancy Walton Laurie (born 1952), daughter of Walmart co-founder James "Bud" Walton
Chumlee (full name Austin Lee Russell, born 1982), star of History Channel TV show Pawn Stars
 Mary Wilson (1944–2021), singer
 Celine Dion (born 1968), French-Canadian singer, global superstar

References

External links

City of Henderson official website

 
1941 establishments in Nevada
Cities in Clark County, Nevada
Cities in the Mojave Desert
Las Vegas Valley
Populated places established in 1941
Cities in Nevada